Love Me, Love Me may refer to:

"Love Me, Love Me", charting single (Walker, Di Chiarra) by Dean Martin 1952, later included on album Hey, Brother, Pour the Wine 1964 
"Love Me, Love Me", song by Big Time Rush from Elevate
"Love Me, Love Me", song by Korean group Winner from Our Twenty For

See also
"Love Me, Love Me Love", a 1971 song by Frank Mills